The Raketenjagdpanzer 1 is an anti-tank guided missile-armed tank destroyer (the first such vehicle in service with the West German Armed Forces) that entered service in 1961. It was built on the chassis of the Hispano-Suiza HS.30, which was also used on the Schützenpanzer SPz 12-3, and armed with twin French SS.11 antitank guided missile launchers. Only one of the missile launchers is visible from the outside at any time, however, as the other is retracted into the hull to be reloaded when the first is ready to fire.

Armament
The twin mounted launchers for the SS.11 anti-tank guided weapons were the primary armament for the Raketenjagdpanzer 1. With ten missiles per vehicle, the crew had the theoretical ability to destroy ten enemy vehicles, although this was doubtful in practice. The weapon was wire-guided and the gunner continued to control the missile via a small periscope after launch. The SS.11 missile could penetrate 600 mm of rolled homogeneous armor.

Powerplant
The Rolls-Royce B81 Mk 80F engine, which could develop 235 hp @ 3,800 rpm, was chosen to power the Raketenjagdpanzer 1. The engine was capable of pushing the vehicle to speeds of 51 km/h.

Performance
The vehicle had a fording depth of 0.70 metres and was able to climb 60° gradients, clear vertical obstacles of 0.60 metres in height or cross trenches 1.60 metres wide.

References

Tank destroyers of Germany
Military vehicles introduced in the 1960s